Alan Jacobs may refer to: 

Alan Jacobs (academic) (born 1958), American writer and professor
Alan Jacobs (filmmaker), American film director and producer

See also
Allan Jacobs (born 1928), American urban designer
Allen Jacobs (1941–2014), American professional football player